The Cass Corridor is the name of the neighborhoods on the west end of Midtown Detroit. It includes the Cass Park Historic District, the Cass-Davenport Historic District and Old Chinatown. The corridor's main street, Cass Avenue, runs parallel with M-1 (Woodward Avenue), a main Detroit artery running north toward New Center. Though Cass runs from Congress Street, ending a few miles farther north at West Grand Boulevard, the Cass Corridor generally is defined as between Interstate 75 (I-75) at its southern end and Interstate 94 (I-94) to the north, and stretches from Woodward to the east and to the west: John C. Lodge (M-10 service drive) north of Temple, and Grand River Avenue south of Temple.

History

Significant landmarks of the area include the Detroit Masonic Temple (the world's largest building of its kind), Cass Technical High School, and the Metropolitan Center for High Technology are all located along Cass. Little Caesars Arena, open since September 5, 2017, as the new home of the NHL's Detroit Red Wings and the NBA's Detroit Pistons, is on the west side of Woodward Avenue near I-75.

In the 1960s and '70s, the Cass Corridor became an area of cultural significance. Artists began renting cheap studio space in the Cass Corridor, which was near Detroit's Cultural Center Historic District. Artists associated with or influenced by the Cass Corridor artist movement include Brenda Goodman, Gary Grimshaw, Tyree Guyton, Charles McGee, Ann Mikolowski, Jim Pallas, Ellen Phelan, Gilda Snowden, Robert Wilbert, and Theo Wujcik.

In the 1970s, the Cass Corridor was a poor neighborhood known for drugs, prostitution and sex crimes against children. The area was of significance in the Oakland County Child Killer case.

Creem, which billed itself as "America's Only Rock 'n' Roll Magazine," had its headquarters in the area. The student population contributes to the bohemian atmosphere in Cass Corridor. The artistic community has produced a number of significant artists, including Sixto Rodriguez, Negative Approach and The White Stripes, who played their first show at the Gold Dollar.
Cass Corridor is also the location of the annual Dally in the Alley arts festival.

Since the 2000s, Joel Landy, president of the Cass Avenue Development construction company, has renovated and remodelled several buildings in the Cass Corridor. Landy was also featured in the television series American Pickers (season 3 episode "Motor City", September 19, 2011). Since 1997, Avalon International Breads has been located in the Cass Corridor. In 2015, Jack White of the White Stripes, opened a retail store for his Record Label, Third Man Records at the Corner of Canfield and Cass.

From 2009, Dr. Alesia Montgomery of Michigan State University conducted a 5-year study visualizing a reinvented Detroit as a green city, with a particular emphasis on the Cass Corridor.

See also
 Chinatown Detroit
 List of places named for Lewis Cass

References

External links 
 Tribes of the Cass Corridor
 Pieces by Cass Corridor artists at the University of Michigan Museum of Art
Exhibition: Cass Corridor Culture: In and Around Wayne State, 1960s - 1980s at Wayne State University
Cass Corridor materials at the Detroit Historical Society
"Discovering the Treasures of an Artist from the Cass Corridor Movement" article from Hyperallergic

Artists from Detroit
Midtown Detroit
Neighborhoods in Detroit